Jack Gregory may refer to:
 John Walter Gregory (1864–1932), Australian geologist, commonly known as Jack Gregory
 Jack Gregory (cricketer) (1895–1973), Australian cricketer
 Jack Gregory (American football guard) (1915–2003), American football player for the University of Alabama, University of Chattanooga and Cleveland Rams
 Jack Gregory (sprinter) (1923–2003), British sprinter
 Jack Gregory (footballer, born 1925) (1925–2008), English football full back for Southampton and Leyton Orient
 Jack Gregory (footballer, born 1926) (1926–1995), English football inside forward for West Ham United and Scunthorpe United
 Jack Gregory (American football coach) (1927–2014), college football head coach for East Stroudsburg, Villanova, and Rhode Island
 Jack I. Gregory (born 1931), general in the United States Air Force
 Jack Gregory (defensive end) (1944–2019), American football defensive end

See also
 John Gregory (disambiguation)